Thibauld Boudignon is a five-star French winery located in Savennières, France. It was established in 2009 by Thibaud Boudignon, who makes wine under his own name. The name began to circulate around top restaurants in Paris, and eventually overseas.

Varieties

References

Wineries of France